Geghi is a village in the Kajaran Municipality of the Syunik Province in Armenia.

History 
The village had 570 inhabitants in 1959, 932 in 1970 and 1,115 inhabitants in 1979.

Population 
The Statistical Committee of Armenia reported the community's population as 172 at the 2011 Armenian census, up from 138 in 2010, but down from 227 at the 2001 census.

Municipal administration 
Geghi was previously a community which included the villages of Geghi, Geghavank, Kard, Kitsk, Verin Geghavank and Karut, until the June 2017 administrative and territorial reforms, when the village became a part of the Kajaran Municipality.

References 

Populated places in Syunik Province